Ricardo Gutiérrez Abascal (1883–1963), also known by his pseudonym Juan de la Encina, was a Spanish art critic.

Life
He was born in Bilbao, and educated in Germany.  In 1931 he was named director of the Madrid Museum of Modern Art but exiled to Mexico in 1939.  He authored The Masters of Modern Art (Los Maestros del Arte Moderno), Julio Antonio (1920), Victorio Macho (1926), and Altarpiece of Modern Painting (Retablo de la Pintura Moderna) (1953).  He was also known by the pseudonym Juan de la Encina.  He died in Mexico.

See also
 Victorio Macho
 Pilar de Zubiaurre

References

1883 births
1963 deaths
People from Bilbao
20th-century Spanish writers
20th-century Spanish male writers
Spanish anti-fascists
Spanish people of the Spanish Civil War (Republican faction)
Exiles of the Spanish Civil War in Mexico
Spanish expatriates in Germany